La Roche-de-Glun is a commune in the Drôme department in southeastern France. It lies on the left bank of the Rhône, opposite the village Glun (Ardèche department).

Population

See also
Communes of the Drôme department

References

Communes of Drôme